According to the City of Portland, "In all categories, the Eastside is more racially diverse than the Westside. Hispanics are most concentrated in North Portland at nearly 15% of the population. NE Portland has the highest concentration of African Americans at 30%. The concentration of Asians in Portland are mostly within NE, SE, and outer East Portland, with a percent population of 11%, 10%, and 9% respectively. Whites are the most common race group citywide."

In 2016, Alana Semuels of The Atlantic wrote, "As black people moved into Albina, whites moved out; by the end of the 1950s, there were 23,000 fewer white residents and 7,000 more black residents than there had been at the beginning of the decade." She also said "by 1999, blacks owned 36 percent fewer homes than they had a decade earlier, while whites owned 43 percent more." In 2021, the Southeast Examiner Don MacGillivray said "Portland is known for its lack of racial diversity and its lack of African Americans", with a Black population at six percent and Latinos at 10 percent of the city's population.

Asians

Chinese

Koreans

Japanese

Hispanic/Latino

Romani
Portland has a substantial Romani population.

See also

 Gentrification of Portland, Oregon
 Racism in Oregon

References